Flockstars is a British television series that ran on ITV from 30 July to 17 September 2015 hosted by Gabby Logan.

The show was cancelled after just one series.

Format
The show followed celebrities as they tried to master the art of sheep herding.

Celebrities

Episodes

Heat rounds

Episode 1 (30 July)

Episode 2 (6 August 2015)

Episode 3 (13 August 2015)

Episode 4 (20 August 2015)

Semi-finals

Episode 5 (27 August)

Episode 6 (3 September 2015)

Episode 7 (10 September 2015)

Final (17 September)

References

External links

2010s British reality television series
2015 British television series debuts
2015 British television series endings
English-language television shows
ITV reality television shows